Paulo César Carpegiani (born 7 February 1949, in Erechim) is a Brazilian retired footballer who played as a midfielder.

Playing career 
Carpegiani began his professional career at Sport Club Internacional of Porto Alegre, in Rio Grande do Sul, where he played from 1970 to 1977, winning two Brazilian Championships (1975 and 1976). Carpegiani also played for Flamengo (1977–1980), winning the Brazilian Championship in 1980.

Coaching career 
Upon retiring, he started a career as a football coach. To begin with Carpegiani coached Flamengo and won the Copa Libertadores de América (Libertadores Cup) and the Intercontinental Cup, beating Liverpool, in 1981. He also won a Brazilian Championship in 1982. In 1992, he was coach of the Barcelona Sporting Club (Guayaquil - Ecuador). In 2007, he was hired by the Corinthians. The team lost in his first match, against Clube Náutico Capibaribe, and the club was eliminated from the Copa do Brasil in the quarter finals. His first match of the Campeonato Brasileiro was against Esporte Clube Juventude and Corinthians won.

His best performance as a coach was with the Paraguay national team from 1996 to 1998 (including a good run in the World Cup, losing to France in extra time). On April 10, 2009 Carpegiani was hired as Vitória's head coach. On June 1, 2010 Atlético Paranaense officials hired the former Vitória coach to replace Leandro Niehues.

Career statistics

Head coach

Honors

Player
Internacional
Campeonato Brasileiro Série A: 1975, 1976
Campeonato Gaúcho: 1969 to 1976

Flamengo
Campeonato Brasileiro Série A: 1980
Campeonato Carioca: 1978, 1979

Coach
Flamengo
Copa Libertadores: 1981
Intercontinental Cup: 1981
Campeonato Brasileiro Série A: 1982

Náutico
Campeonato Brasileiro Série B: 1986

Cerro Porteño
Paraguayan First Division: 1994

Atlético Paranaense
Campeonato Paranaense: 2001

Vitória
Campeonato Baiano: 2009

Individual honors
Silver Ball Revista Placar- Internacional
3rd Paraguay best manager all time- 1998 World Cup

References

External links
Profile at cbf.com.br

1949 births
Living people
People from Erechim
Brazilian footballers
Brazilian football managers
Campeonato Brasileiro Série A players
1974 FIFA World Cup players
1979 Copa América players
1997 Copa América managers
1998 FIFA World Cup managers
Brazilian people of Italian descent
Brazil international footballers
Brazilian expatriate sportspeople in Paraguay
Expatriate football managers in Paraguay
Campeonato Brasileiro Série A managers
Association football midfielders
Sport Club Internacional players
CR Flamengo footballers
CR Flamengo managers
Al Nassr FC managers
Sport Club Internacional managers
Clube Náutico Capibaribe managers
Bangu Atlético Clube managers
Cerro Porteño managers
Sociedade Esportiva Palmeiras managers
Barcelona S.C. managers
Coritiba Foot Ball Club managers
Paraguay national football team managers
São Paulo FC managers
Club Athletico Paranaense managers
Cruzeiro Esporte Clube managers
Kuwait national football team managers
Sport Club Corinthians Paulista managers
Esporte Clube Vitória managers
Associação Atlética Ponte Preta managers
Esporte Clube Bahia managers
Brazilian expatriate sportspeople in Kuwait
Brazilian expatriate sportspeople in Saudi Arabia
Expatriate football managers in Saudi Arabia
Expatriate football managers in Kuwait
Expatriate football managers in Ecuador
Saudi Professional League managers
Brazilian expatriate sportspeople in Ecuador
Sportspeople from Rio Grande do Sul